Maharashtra State Highway 248 is a State highway that runs from Nagpur in north west direction through Nagpur, and touches Warud north east of Amravati districts in the state of Maharashtra.  This state highway touches numerous cities and villages VIZ. Nagpur, Kalmeshwar, Katol, Jalalkheda and Warud.

Major junctions 

This highway started from the intersection at Chhawani Square in Nagpur with NH 69.

National Highways 
 NH 69 in Nagpur City

State Highways 

MSH 10 at Warud
MH SH 260 in Nagpur City
MH SH 250 at Kalmeshwar
MH SH 265 at Kalmeshwar and Dorli village
MH SH 245 at Bharsinghi Village and Jalalkheda Village in Narkhed taluka
MH SH 247 at Katol
MH SH 244 at Warud

Connections 
Many villages, cities and towns in various districts are connecting by this state highway.

References

See also 
 List of State Highways in Maharashtra

Transport in Nagpur
State Highways in Maharashtra
State Highways in Nagpur District